In iterative reconstruction in digital imaging, interior reconstruction (also known as limited field of view (LFV) reconstruction) is a technique to correct truncation artifacts caused by limiting image data to a small field of view. The reconstruction focuses on an area known as the region of interest (ROI). Although interior reconstruction can be applied to dental or cardiac CT images, the concept is not limited to CT. It is applied with one of several methods.

Methods
The purpose of each method is to solve for vector  in the following problem:

For CT image-reconstruction purposes, .

The first interior-reconstruction method listed below is extrapolation. It is a local tomography method which eliminates truncation artifacts but introduces another type of artifact: a bowl effect. An improvement is known as the adaptive extrapolation method, although the iterative extrapolation method below also improves reconstruction results. In some cases, the exact reconstruction can be found for the interior reconstruction. The local inverse method below modifies the local tomography method, and may improve the reconstruction result of the local tomography; the iterative reconstruction method can be applied to interior reconstruction. Among the above methods, extrapolation is often applied.

Extrapolation method 

Vector  is inside the region of interest ,. Vector  is outside the region . This region is denoted ,.
In CT image reconstruction, it has

The response in the outside region can be a guess ; for example, assume it is 

 

The result depends on how good the extrapolation function  is. A frequent choice is

 
at the boundary of the two regions.
The extrapolation method is often combined with a priori knowledge, and an extrapolation method which reduces calculation time is shown below.

Adaptive extrapolation method 

The response in the outside region  can be calculated as follows:

The reconstructed image can be calculated as follows:

It is assumed that 
 
at the boundary of the interior region;  solves the problem, and is known as the adaptive extrapolation method.
 is the adaptive extrapolation function.

Iterative extrapolation method 

or

The reconstruction can be obtained as

Here  is an extrapolation function, and it is assumed that

 is one solution of this problem.

Local tomography 
Local tomography, with a very short filter, is also known as lambda tomography.

Local inverse method 
The local inverse method extends the concept of local tomography. The response in the outside region can be calculated as follows:

Consider the generalized inverse  satisfying

Define 

so that

Hence,

The above equation can be solved as
 
,

considering that

The solution can be simplified as
.

The matrix 
 
is known as the local inverse of matrix 
This is known as the local inverse method.

Iterative reconstruction method 
Here a goal function is defined, and this method iteratively achieves the goal. If the goal function can be some kind of normal, this is known as the minimal norm method.

,
subject to

 
and 
 is known,

An example of this method is the projection onto convex sets (POCS) method.

Analytical solution

Fast extrapolation
Extrapolated data often convolutes to a kernel function. After data is extrapolated its size is increased N times, where N = 2 ~ 3. If the data needs to be convoluted to a known kernel function, the numerical calculations will increase log(N)·N times, even with the fast Fourier transform (FFT). An algorithm exists, analytically calculating the contribution from part of the extrapolated data. The calculation time can be omitted, compared to the original convolution calculation; with this algorithm, the calculation of a convolution using the extrapolated data is not noticeably increased. This is known as fast extrapolation.

Comparison of methods
The extrapolation method is suitable in a situation where 
  and 
 i.e. a small truncation artifacts situation.

The adaptive extrapolation method is suitable for a situation where 
  and 
 i.e. a normal truncation artifacts situation. This method also offers a rough solution for the exterior region.

The iterative extrapolation method is suitable for a situation in which 
  and 
 i.e. a normal truncation artifacts situation. Although this method gets better interior reconstruction compared to adaptive reconstruction, it misses the result in the exterior region.

Local tomography is suitable for a situation in which 
  and 
 i.e. a largest truncation artifacts situation. Although there are no truncation artifacts in this method, there is a fixed error (independent of the value of ) in the reconstruction.

The local inverse method, identical to local tomography, suitable in a situation in which 
  and 
 i.e. a largest truncation artifacts situation. Although there are no truncation artifacts for this method, there is a fixed error (independent of the value of ) in the reconstruction which may be smaller than with local tomography.

The iterative reconstruction method obtains a good result with large calculations. Although the analytic method achieves an exact result, it is only functional in some situations. The fast extrapolation method can get the same results as the other extrapolation methods, and can be applied to the above interior reconstruction methods to reduce the calculation.

See also

Forecasting
Minimum polynomial extrapolation
Multigrid method
Prediction interval
Regression analysis
Richardson extrapolation
Static analysis
Trend estimation
Interpolation
Extrapolation domain analysis
Dead reckoning
Image reconstruction
Local inverse
Generalized inverse
Extrapolation

Notes

Medical imaging